Irish Luck is a 1925 American silent comedy-drama film directed by Victor Heerman, produced by Famous Players-Lasky, and distributed by Paramount Pictures.

Plot
As described in a review in a film magazine, Tom Donahue (Meighan), a Fifth Avenue traffic policeman from New York City, wins a trip to Ireland in a newspaper contest. He looks like Lord Fitzhugh, nephew of a nobleman who has cut him out of his will in favor of his cousine. On his deathbed, the Earl (Lawford) longs to make up with Fitzhugh. Fitzhugh's sister Gwendolyn (Wilson) meets Tom and takes him back to Killarney with her and, when Fitzhugh fails to appear, persuades Tom to impersonate him and gains the fortune. Eventually, Tom frees Fitzhugh, who had been lured to Killarney, and wins the love of the young woman.

Cast

Preservation
A print of Irish Luck is located in the George Eastman Museum Motion Picture Collection.

References

External links

Lobby card at silentfilmstillarchive.com

1925 films
American silent feature films
1925 comedy-drama films
Films directed by Victor Heerman
1920s English-language films
American black-and-white films
Paramount Pictures films
Films set in Ireland
Films set in New York City
Films set on ships
1920s American films
Silent comedy-drama films
Silent adventure films
Silent American comedy-drama films